New Amravati railway station is a small railway station in Amravati city of Maharashtra. Its code is NAVI.

Infrastructure

The station building was inaugurated in December 2011. The platform is not well sheltered. It lacks many facilities including water and sanitation.

Location
The main railway station of the city, Amravati railway station, is nearby to this station. This station is deemed suitable for local travelling within Amravati City.

References

External links

 

Railway stations in Amravati district
Bhusawal railway division
Transport in Amravati